József Hátszeghy (13 January 1904 – 18 January 1988) was a Hungarian foil fencer and coach. He competed at the 1936 and 1948 Summer Olympics.

Family
He was born in Arač, Austria-Hungary. His father, Adolf Hatz, and his mother, Anna Reimann, wanted a military career for all four of their sons. His brother Otto Hátszegi also became a Hungarian military officer and an Olympic fencer.

References

External links
 

1904 births
1988 deaths
Hungarian male foil fencers
Olympic fencers of Hungary
Fencers at the 1936 Summer Olympics
Fencers at the 1948 Summer Olympics
People from Novi Bečej
Hungarians in Vojvodina